José Briceño (born September 19, 1992) is a Venezuelan professional baseball catcher in the Kansas City Royals organization. He has played in Major League Baseball (MLB) for the Los Angeles Angels.

Career
Briceño was born in Caracas, Venezuela.

Colorado Rockies
He was signed on May 29, 2010, by the Colorado Rockies and was assigned to the DSL Rockies. In 2013, he played for the Asheville Tourists, Tri-City Dust Devils, and Grand Junction Rockies. He spent the 2014 season with the Tourists in Asheville.

Atlanta Braves
The Rockies traded Briceño and catcher Chris O'Dowd to the Atlanta Braves for pitchers David Hale and Gus Schlosser on January 30, 2015. Briceño spent the season with the Carolina Mudcats.

Los Angeles Angels
The Braves traded Briceño and Andrelton Simmons to the Los Angeles Angels for Erick Aybar, Sean Newcomb, Chris Ellis and cash on November 12, 2015. 

Briceño played 2016 with the Inland Empire 66ers, Arkansas Travelers and Salt Lake Bees. He was invited to Spring Training for the 2017 season. After failing to make the team, Briceño spent 2017 with the Bees and the Mobile BayBears. Briceño was again invited to Spring Training in 2018, and again failed to make the team and was reassigned to Salt Lake.

He was called up to the majors for the first time on May 20, 2018. 

In 2018 in AAA, he batted .277/.297/.536 with 8 home runs and 25 RBIs in 112 at bats for the Salt Lake Bees in the Pacific Coast League. 

He hit a home run in his first Major League game on May 26, 2018. For the season, in the major leagues he batted 239/.299/.385 with five home runs and 10 RBIs in at 117 bats.

On August 8, 2019, the Angels released Briceño. Briceño re-signed with the Angels on a minor league deal on September 1, 2019. He was invited to Spring Training for the 2020 season as a non-roster invite. On August 31, 2020, Briceño was selected to the 40-man and active rosters. On October 30, 2020, Briceño was outrighted off of the 40-man roster. He became a free agent on November 2, 2020.

Colorado Rockies (second stint)
On November 13, 2020, Briceño signed a minor league contract with the Colorado Rockies organization. Briceño was assigned to the Triple-A Albuquerque Isotopes to begin the 2021 season. After hitting .212/.257/.434 with 5 home runs and 15 RBI in 31 games for Albuquerque, Briceño was released by the Rockies on July 21, 2021.

Lexington Legends
On August 20, 2021, Briceño signed with the Lexington Legends of the Atlantic League of Professional Baseball. He became a free agent following the season. On March 5, 2022, Briceño re-signed with the Legends for the 2022 season.

Kansas City Royals
On May 24, 2022, Briceño's contract was purchased by the Kansas City Royals organization. Briceño played in 41 games for the Triple-A Omaha Storm Chasers, batting .252/.298/.405 with 4 home runs and 21 RBI. He elected free agency on November 10, 2022.

On January 25, 2023, Briceño re-signed with the Royals organization on a minor league contract.

References

External links

1992 births
Living people
Arkansas Travelers players
Asheville Tourists players
Carolina Mudcats players
Dominican Summer League Rockies players
Venezuelan expatriate baseball players in the Dominican Republic
Grand Junction Rockies players
Inland Empire 66ers of San Bernardino players
Los Angeles Angels players
Major League Baseball players from Venezuela
Major League Baseball catchers
Mobile BayBears players
Navegantes del Magallanes players
Salt Lake Bees players
Baseball players from Caracas
Venezuelan expatriate baseball players in the United States
Lexington Legends players
Omaha Storm Chasers players
Albuquerque Isotopes players